Music Box Brazil is an entertainment channel owned by Box Brazil cable and satellite television channel operator. Is the first channel dedicated exclusively to Brazilian music and is one of the main music channels in Brazil, among others like Multishow, MTV and Bis.

The channel went on air on January 1, 2012, after regulation by the Agência Nacional do Cinema (Ancine), which granted some channels the title of Brazilian channels with qualified space programmed by an independent Brazilian programmer, among which stand out the Prime Box Brazil, Travel Box Brazil and FashionTV channels, belonging to the same company. Music Box Brazil is available through Claro TV, Vivo TV, OI TV and via streamung through Box Brazil Play.

Programming
 Babilônia
 Music Drops with MV Bill
 Estúdio Cabeça 
 Fique em Casa com o Music  
 História Secreta do Pop Brasileiro 
 Jukebox  
 Contando Músicas, Cantando Histórias

References

Television networks in Brazil
Television stations in Brazil
2012 establishments in Brazil
Television channels and stations established in 2012